Kyle Swanston (born October 24, 1986) is an American former professional basketball player for the Akita Northern Happinets of the Japanese bj league. He played college basketball at James Madison and went undrafted during the 2009 NBA Draft.

Early life 
Swanston was born in Brooksville, Florida. He was a star basketball player at Worcester Academy, graduating in 2005. He was regarded a 0-star recruit coming out of high school. 

He committed to play for James Madison University with interest in 3 other colleges.  

Swanston finished 3rd in JMU history for three-pointers made with 206. He led the CAA made in the 2008-2009 season (95). Tied JMU's record for three-pointers made in a single game against Liberty with 9 in the 2008-2009 season.

College statistics

|-
| style="text-align:left;"| 2005-06
| style="text-align:left;"| James Madison
| 27 ||14  ||21.4  || .407 || .359 || .842|| 2.41 ||1.04  || 0.26 || 0.11 || 5.85
|-
| style="text-align:left;"| 2006-07
| style="text-align:left;"| James Madison
| 30 ||27  ||25.1  || .408 || .350 || .667|| 2.63 ||1.20  || 0.57 || 0.17 || 6.50
|-
| style="text-align:left;"| 2007-08
| style="text-align:left;"| James Madison
| 23 ||20  ||27.9  || .429 || .395 || .655||3.57  ||1.09  || 0.35 || 0.26 || 9.39
|-
| style="text-align:left;"| 2008-09
| style="text-align:left;"| James Madison
| 35 ||29  ||30.1  || .392 || .408 || .821|| 3.54 ||0.97  || 0.63 || 0.29 || 11.57
|-
|- class="sortbottom"
! style="text-align:center;" colspan=2|  Career

!115 ||90 || 26.3 ||.406  || .387 ||.761  || 3.04 ||1.07  || 0.47 ||0.21  || 8.47
|-

Career statistics

Regular season 

|-
| align="left" |  2009-10
| align="left" | Korikobrat
| 27 ||   || 34.7 || .557 || .423 || .833 || 5.4|| 1.0 || 0.1 || 0.2 ||21.3
|-
| align="left" |  2010-11
| align="left" | Clavijo
| 28 ||   || 27.8 || .466 || .372 || .691 || 2.9 || 1.1 || 0.3 || 0.1 ||13.4
|-
| align="left" |  2011-12
| align="left" | Palencia
| 14 || 2 || 19.5 || .444 || .452 || .722 || 2.21 || 0.36 || 0.57 || 0.29 ||6.86
|-
| align="left" |  2012-13
| align="left" | Akita
| 21 || 21 || 32.5 || .337 || .286 || .802 || 4.2 || 2.0 || 1.0 || 0.2 || 19.2
|-
| align="left" |  2012-13
| align="left" | Kaposvári
| 41 || 41 || 37.6 || .438 || .389 || .768 || 4.66 || 1.51 || 1.49 || 0.20 || 20.24
|-

Playoffs 

|-
|style="text-align:left;"|2011-12
|style="text-align:left;"|Akita
| 4 ||  || 23.0 || .294 || .222 || .923 || 3.5 || 1.8 || 0.5 || 0.0 || 9.5
|-
|style="text-align:left;"|2012-13
|style="text-align:left;"| Kaposvari 
| 11||  || 38.5 || .425 || .340 || .808 || 4.5 || 2.0 || 1.7 || 0.2 || 19.2
|-

References

External links
Akita vs Nagano
Kyle Swanston on Youtube
Stats Akita Happinets
Swanston in Akita, Japan
Bj players cards

1986 births
Living people
Akita Northern Happinets players
American expatriate basketball people in Finland
American expatriate basketball people in Hungary
American expatriate basketball people in Italy
American expatriate basketball people in Japan
American expatriate basketball people in Spain
American men's basketball players
Basketball players from Florida
CB Clavijo players
James Madison Dukes men's basketball players
Kaposvári KK players
Kobrat players
Palencia Baloncesto players
People from Spring Hill, Florida
Sportspeople from the Tampa Bay area
Forwards (basketball)